Gary Crosby may refer to:

Gary Crosby (actor) (1933–1995), American singer and actor, son of Bing Crosby
Gary Crosby (bassist) (born 1955), British double bass player
Gary Crosby (footballer) (born 1964), former Nottingham Forest winger